The 2022 Fareham Borough Council election took place on 5 May 2022 to elect members of Fareham Borough Council. This was on the same day as other local elections. 16 of the 31 seats were up for election.

Background
Since its first election in 1973, Fareham has been under Conservative control, apart from periods of no overall control from 1973 to 1976, 1986 and 1987, and 1994 to 1999. The Liberal Democrats briefly overtook the Conservatives to become the largest party from 1994 to 1999. In the 2021 election the Conservatives gained 1 seat with 56.2% of the vote, the Liberal Democrats made no gains or losses with 22.0%, independents made no gains or losses with 7.7%, and UKIP lost their seat on the council without contesting any seats.

The seats up for election this year were last elected in 2018. In that election, the Conservatives gained 1 seat with 54.1% of the vote, the Liberal Democrats made no net gains or losses with 28.4%, independents made no gains or losses with 3.5%, and UKIP lost the seat they were defending with 0.2%.

As a result of this election, the Conservatives increased their majority to 20 seats for the first time since 2002.  The Liberal Democrats maintained their 5 seats, having gained the Fareham East ward from the Conservatives, but losing Stubbington to the same party.  This election also saw the "Fareham Independent Group", registered as a political party, standing for the first time across a number of wards - although unsuccessfully.

Previous council composition

Results

Map of seats won

Results by ward
An asterisk indicates an incumbent councillor.

Fareham East

Fareham North

Fareham North West

Fareham South

Fareham West

Hill Head

Locks Heath

Park Gate

Portchester East

Portchester West

Sarisbury

Stubbington

Titchfield

Titchfield Common

Warsash

By-elections

Portchester East

References

Fareham
Fareham Borough Council elections